Below are the list of current members of Chinese Communist Party (CCP) who holds a significant role or position in the party.

Politburo

Ministry of State Security 
Below are officials of Chinese Communist Party who currently holds position at Ministry of State Security.

Military 
Below are officials of Chinese Communist Party who currently holds position at People's Liberation Army.

Red Cross Society of China 
Below are officials of Chinese Communist Party who currently holds position at Red Cross Society of China.

Education institution 
Below are officials of Chinese Communist Party who currently holds position at education institution in People's Republic of China.

Public company

Private company

References 

Chinese Communist Party
Communist Party
Communist Party